Koroneia may refer to:

two municipalities in Greece:
Koroneia, Thessaloniki
Koroneia, Boeotia
Koroneia (Boeotia), an ancient town in Greece
Koroneia (Thessaly), an ancient town in Greece
Lake Koroneia, near Thessaloniki